Cakung River is a river in the Bekasi, West Java and eastern part of the Special Capital Region of Jakarta, Indonesia. The lower portions of the original river have been channelized and directed into the eastern flood canal, "Banjir Kanal Timur", which continues to flow to the Java Sea in the district of Marunda, Cilincing, North Jakarta. The river regularly causes flooding in the city of Bekasi and Jakarta.

History
Cakung and the other two nearby rivers: Jatikramat and Buaran, flow from Bekasi and interconnect until draining into the Jakarta Bay in the district of Marunda through Cakung Drain and currently through Banjir Kanal Timur. In the past, the three rivers supplied water for drinking and agriculture in the area. Some leftover rice fields can still be seen in Cipinang Melayu, District of Makasar, and District of Cakung.

In 1990, more people occupied Pulogebang and the rice fields were transformed into houses. Since then, Cakung river often overflows during the rain season and causes high floods. A research by Pieter J Kunu and H Lelolterry of the Pattimura University, Ambon, showed that the development of the city changed 85% land of Jakarta to be waterproof, unable to absorb surface water and resulted in regular floods. One of the solutions was by constructing a flood-control canal, Banjir Kanal Timur. The flow of Cakung, Buaran, Jati Kramat, Sunter, and Cipinang rivers was cut to drain into the canal, and thereby reducing the occurrence of flood.

After the old Cakung river flow in Pulogebang was cut by the flood-control canal, Banjir Kanal Timur, in the old maps there was still a small stream flowing away from the canal, identified as Cakung river. However, in reality this stream resembles a street gutter with a width of 1 meter, flowing out starting about 300 meter from the bank of Kanal Timur. The flow of this new Cakung widens a few hundred meters to the north, as can be seen in Rawa Kuning Street, Ujung Menteng, District of Cakung, East Jakarta, reaching a width of 3 meter.

Currently, the old river flowing to Banjir Kanal Timur has a function as drainage from the industrial and household waste. It badly affect the river quality, resulting darkened water and unpleasant smell.

Hydrology
The average daily rainfall is 142 mm, with the peak debit at 60 m³.

Geography
The river flows in the northwest area of Java with predominantly tropical rainforest climate (designated as Af in the Köppen-Geiger climate classification). The annual average temperature in the area is 26 °C. The warmest month is August, when the average temperature is around 28 °C, and the coldest is April, at 24 °C. The average annual rainfall is 3674 mm. The wettest month is December, with an average of 456 mm rainfall, and the driest is September, with 87 mm rainfall.

Normalisation 
Anticipating the flood in 2017, the government of Jakarta widens 1.5 km of the old Cakung river in Pegangsaan Dua, District of Kelapa Gading and Sukapura, Semper Barat, District of Cilincing. The dredging is necessary to remove the mud sedimentation that rapidly narrows the stream.

References

Rivers of Jakarta
Rivers of Indonesia